Lorenzo Fontana (born 10 April 1980) is an Italian politician and member of the League (Lega), who is serving as President of the Chamber of Deputies since 14 October 2022.

Fontana served as Minister of European Affairs in the Conte I Cabinet. He previously served as Minister of Family and Disability from 1 June 2018 to 10 July 2019, and as Vice-President of the Chamber of Deputies from 29 March to 1 June 2018. He is also the Deputy Federal Secretary of Lega under the leadership of Matteo Salvini.

Early life
Lorenzo Fontana was born in Verona, Veneto, in 1980. He graduated in political science at the University of Padua, in Christian history at the European University of Rome and in philosophy at the Pontifical University of Saint Thomas Aquinas. During the university, he joined the Liga Veneta, the regional branch of Lega Nord (LN), and in 2002 he was elected vice-secretary of the Young Padanians Movement, the League's youth wing.

Fontana is married and has one daughter. He is a fervent traditionalist Catholic and regularly attends the Tridentine Mass. His spiritual counsellor is Father Vilmar Pavesi , a priest of that church, who is a well-known monarchist and an opponent of abortion, divorce, euthanasia, and LGBT rights.

Political career

After being elected to Verona city council, he was elected to the European Parliament with 52,136 votes during the 2009 European Parliament election in Italy. In 2012, he was the head of the League's group in the European Parliament. From 2009 to 2014, he was also vice-president of the European Parliament Committee on Culture and Education. During the 8th legislature, he was also the supervisor of the cooperation deal between Bosnia-Herzegovina and Europol. Fontana was re-elected to the 2014 European Parliament election in Italy, gaining 27,240 votes and becoming a member of the European Parliament Committee on Civil Liberties, Justice and Home Affairs (LIBE) and of the Delegation for Relations with Iraq (D–IQ).

On 26 February 2016, he was appointed by Matteo Salvini as Deputy Federal Secretary of the League, a position that he held together with Giancarlo Giorgetti. On 8 July 2017, he became deputy mayor of Verona. At the 2018 Italian general election, Fontana was elected to the Chamber of Deputies for the multi-member constituency of Veneto 2. From April to August 2018, he served as one of the vice-presidents of the Chamber.

On 1 June 2018, the League and the Five Star Movement (M5S) formed a coalition government led by the independent university professor Giuseppe Conte. The government was sworn in on 5 September 2019. Fontana was appointed Minister of Family and Minister for Disabilities. In August 2018, Fontana called for the repeal of the 1993 Mancino Law, which criminalises hate speech, saying the law was being used by globalists to promote "anti-Italian racism". In March 2019, he helped organize the anti-gay, anti-feminist, and anti-abortion World Congress of Families in Verona, to the point of authorizing the use of the logo of Conte's administrative office in order to promote the event without the prime minister's permission.

On 10 July 2019, Fontana was appointed Italy's Minister of European Affairs. In August 2019, the League filed a motion of no confidence in the coalition government and the cabinet collapsed.

President of the Chamber of Deputies
After the 2022 Italian general election, which saw a clear victory of the centre-right coalition able of winning an absolute majority both in the Chamber and the Senate of the Republic, Fontana was re-elected to the Chamber for the single-member constituency of Verona, gaining 132,554 votes. On 14 October, Fontana was elected President of the Chamber of Deputies in the fourth round with 222 votes out of 400.

In his inauguration speech, Fontana thanked President Sergio Mattarella and Pope Francis for their role in Italy's life and quoted several Catholic personalities, such as Saint Thomas Aquinas and Blessed Carlo Acutis.

Political views
Fontana is widely considered an ultraconservative.
He calls himself a "crusader" who fights against abortion, euthanasia, same-sex civil unions, and stepchild adoption, which he considers as a "weakening of the family". He is also against "pro-LGBT" sexual education, stating that Vladimir Putin's Russia "is the reference for those who believe in a nationalist model of society". Fontana is an admirer of Putin, who described as a light for the Western world. On 2 June 2018, the day after becoming minister, he added that "gay families do not exist", labelling them as "filth". He opposes illegal immigration to Italy, claiming it to be a serious threat that "aims to erase the Italian people along with their communities and traditions", along with "gay marriages and the so-called gender theory in schools". 

During his political career, Fontana built strong ties with neo-Nazi groups in his hometown Verona. In 2016, he welcomed and greeted Golden Dawn, a Greek neo-Nazi party later judged by the Supreme Civil and Criminal Court of Greece as a criminal organization, and he described its members as "fighters", stating that "their contribution will be decisive".

Works
In 2018, Fontana wrote with Ettore Gotti Tedeschi the book The Empty Cradle of Civilization. At the Origin of the Crisis, about the risks related to demographic decline in Italy.

Electoral history

References

External links
 (in English)

1980 births
Living people
Italian anti-same-sex-marriage activists
Italian traditionalist Catholics
Politicians of Veneto
Politicians from Verona
University of Padua alumni
21st-century Italian politicians
Venetist politicians
Italian city councillors
Lega Nord MEPs
MEPs for Italy 2009–2014
MEPs for Italy 2014–2019
Deputies of Legislature XVIII of Italy
Government ministers of Italy
Conte I Cabinet
Deputies of Legislature XIX of Italy
Presidents of the Chamber of Deputies (Italy)